Dela Rosa may refer to:

 Dela Rosa railway station, station on the South Main Line ("Southrail") of the Philippine National Railways
 Dela Rosa Transit, a city bus company in the Philippines
 De La Rosa, people with the name